Hockenhull is a former civil parish, now in the parish of Tarvin, in the Borough of Cheshire West and Chester and ceremonial county of Cheshire in England. In 2001 it had a population of 19. The civil parish was abolished in 2015 and merged into Tarvin.

The parish contained one listed building, Hockenhull Hall, which is designed by English Heritage at Grade II*.  This grade is the middle of the three gradings given to listed buildings and is applied to "particularly important buildings of more than special interest".

References

External links

Former civil parishes in Cheshire
Cheshire West and Chester